Dmytro Vasylovych Teryomenko (born 1 February 1987) is a Ukrainian professional volleyball player, a member of the Ukraine national team. He participated at the 2019 European Championship. At the professional club level, he plays for Tours VB.

Honours

Clubs
 CEV Cup
  2021/2022 – with Tours VB
 National championships
 2006/2007  Ukrainian Cup, with Lokomotiv Kharkiv
 2006/2007  Ukrainian Championship, with Lokomotiv Kharkiv
 2007/2008  Ukrainian Cup, with Lokomotiv Kharkiv
 2008/2009  Ukrainian Cup, with Lokomotiv Kharkiv
 2008/2009  Ukrainian Championship, with Lokomotiv Kharkiv
 2009/2010  Ukrainian Cup, with Lokomotiv Kharkiv
 2009/2010  Ukrainian Championship, with Lokomotiv Kharkiv
 2010/2011  Ukrainian Cup, with Lokomotiv Kharkiv
 2010/2011  Ukrainian Championship, with Lokomotiv Kharkiv
 2011/2012  Ukrainian Cup, with Lokomotiv Kharkiv
 2011/2012  Ukrainian Championship, with Lokomotiv Kharkiv
 2012/2013  Ukrainian Cup, with Lokomotiv Kharkiv
 2012/2013  Ukrainian Championship, with Lokomotiv Kharkiv
 2013/2014  Ukrainian Cup, with Lokomotiv Kharkiv
 2013/2014  Ukrainian Championship, with Lokomotiv Kharkiv 
 2014/2015  Ukrainian Cup, with Lokomotiv Kharkiv
 2014/2015  Ukrainian Championship, with Lokomotiv Kharkiv
 2015/2016  Ukrainian Cup, with Lokomotiv Kharkiv
 2015/2016  Ukrainian Championship, with Lokomotiv Kharkiv  
 2018/2019  French Cup, with Tours VB
 2018/2019  French Championship, with Tours VB

Universiade
 2015  Summer Universiade

Individual awards
 2016: Ukrainian Championship – Most Valuable Player 
 2016: Ukrainian Championship – Best Middle Blocker

References

External links
 
 Player profile at PlusLiga.pl 
 Player profile at Volleybox.net

1987 births
Living people
Sportspeople from Kharkiv Oblast
Ukrainian men's volleyball players
Ukrainian expatriate sportspeople in Russia
Expatriate volleyball players in Russia
Ukrainian expatriate sportspeople in Poland
Expatriate volleyball players in Poland
Ukrainian expatriate sportspeople in France
Expatriate volleyball players in France
VC Belogorie players
Czarni Radom players
Tours Volley-Ball players
AZS Olsztyn players
Middle blockers